Nanta may refer to:
Notia, Greece - Nânta
Nanta (show), a South Korean theatrical show

Chinese place name
 Nanta, Chenzhou (南塔街道), a subdistrict of Suxian District, Chenzhou, Hunan.